The Walter Polaris was a Czechoslovakian three-cylinder, air-cooled radial engine for powering light aircraft that was developed in the 1930s.

Applications
Letov Š-39
Rearwin Junior

Engines on display
A preserved example of the Walter Polaris engine is on display at the following museum:
Prague Aviation Museum, Kbely

Specifications (Polaris)

See also

References

Notes

Bibliography

 Gunston, Bill. World Encyclopedia of Aero Engines. Cambridge, England. Patrick Stephens Limited, 1989. 

1930s aircraft piston engines
Polaris
Aircraft air-cooled radial piston engines